Li Lisan (November 18, 1899 – June 22, 1967) was a Chinese politician, member of the Politburo, and later a member of the Central Committee.

Early years 
Li was born in Liling, Hunan province in China in 1899, under the name of Li Rongzhi. His father, a teacher, taught Li Chinese traditional poems and classics. In 1915, he arrived at Changsha for high school and saw an advertisement in a newspaper written by a student from First Normal School of Changsha with the pen name 28 Strokes. Li met, and then became friends with, the young man whose real name was Mao Zedong. Later, Li joined the army of a local warlord in Hunan. One of the Division Commanders, Cheng Qian, who was both Li's father's townsman and alumni, sponsored Li to study in Beijing.

Beginning career

France
When Li reached Beijing, he applied to study in France and arrived there in 1920. He worked part-time as assistant to a boilermaker to earn his tuition. His boss was a member of Communist Party, and Li was influenced in accepting communism, taking part actively in the struggles for Chinese labor rights in France. For his active and fearless revolutionary work, Li was labelled as a trouble-maker. In 1921, Li was expelled with more than 100  other Chinese by the French authorities.

Back in China 
When Li returned to Shanghai, he was introduced by Chen Duxiu to join the Chinese Communist Party (CCP). The party assigned him to organize the labor activities in Anyuan Coal Mine (安源煤矿) in Pingxiang, Jiangxi. Being the most important labor work leader there, Li greatly increased the number of CCP members and perfected methods of organization. By the end of 1924, there were only 900 CCP members throughout China, 300 of whom came from Anyuan Coal Mine. It was at this time that Li showed his great talent in labor work and organization in conjunction with Liu Shaoqi, who later became his deputy.

Certainly, the Nationalists had a high opinion of Li's organisational skills; a secret report prepared during their rural pacification campaign in 1928 explained why they were having particular difficulties in Anyuan:The reason the Communist Party has such a deeply rooted and firm foundation at Anyuan is because in the past the Communists carried out comprehensive 'red education' at Anyuan. Six or seven years ago, the Anyuan workers were all country bumpkins…Not one of them could stand up at a meeting and say a word, let alone deliver a speech. Still less had any of them ever heard of organizing anything. It was only after the Communist bandit Li Lisan went to Anyuan…that the knowledge of how to organize became widespread. Now workers were speaking up at public meetings and even giving lectures! The Communists at Anyuan greatly valued education but they did not mechanically evangelize Communism like a missionary cramming a religious belief into a worker’s head. At first they focused on literacy and basic knowledge. Every week they convened lectures as well as workers’ debate societies and study groups.

In 1926, Li came to Wuhan, the labor work center of China to lead the labor work. Although Xiang Zhongfa, who later became general secretary of the CCP, was the top leader at that time, Li was the man who actually made the decisions. In 1927, after the split of the alliance of Kuomintang with the CCP, Li was the first one to propose  the Nanchang Uprising against the KMT, and took the job as director of the security guards. Though this uprising was proved to be imprudent and planless, and its failure unavoidable, Li was thrust into the central stage of the CCP for his prominence in labor work and his courage under fire.

Reign of Xiang

In the 6th National Congress of CCP held in Moscow, Li's old friend Xiang Zhongfa was elected as General Secretary with the support from the Comintern and the Soviet Union. During the reign of Xiang, Li Lisan played a gradually more important role. Xiang sacked Cai Hesen, the incumbent standing member of Politburo of the CCP and Minister of Propaganda Department of the CCP for Cai's extremist way in directing the Sunzi Division of CCP, which resulted in extreme democracy and discontent at the CCP center. Xiang chose Li to replace Cai. Li became one of only four standing members of the politburo and minister of Propaganda Department of the CCP in October 1928.

When the Far East Bureau of the Comintern issued an order for anti-rightism and blamed the CCP for not being active enough in 1929, Xiang protested this decision. He knew Li was an appropriate candidate for doing the communication work because of his  eloquence and energy. Thus, Li took the job of handling conflicts with the Comintern. When Xiang sent Zhou Enlai to Moscow for further instruction, Li took on Zhou's work in organization too, which gave Li a large enough stage to prove his talent.

Decline
When Xiang learned of the Comintern's decision on anti-rightism, he claimed that the Chinese revolution was in its peak period. Li turned this blindness into extremism, which was later known as Li Lisan line (立三路线), calling for armed uprising in the cities leading by workers and the extension of the revolution to the whole country.

From June 1930, Li Lisan line became mature under the support from Xiang. The CCP gave the daily operation from its headquarters to divisions in all provinces, setting up action committees in all provinces and preparing for the full-scale uprising in October. But the Comintern expressed its discontent, stating that it was working out systemic policies for the Chinese revolution, and the CCP should concentrate on the uprising in one or several provinces instead. Xiang supported Li and stood by his idea  that it was the zero hour of the Chinese revolution. In several rounds of discussion, the tension between Xiang, Li and the Comintern rose greatly. Suspicion and criticism of the CCP towards the Comintern was the same as betrayal in the eyes of the Comintern.

In July 1930, the communist army under the leadership of Li Lisan captured Changsha in Hunan province, but KMT troops defeated his forces just a few days later. The uprisings in other cities were put down by KMT forces quickly. Furthermore, Li had turned many CCP members into his enemies by his authoritarian style. Some of these were old CCP members such as labor activists He Mengxiong and Luo Zhanglong who were blamed for their rightism only because they were against Li's extremism. Wang Ming and his group of 28 Bolsheviks came back from Moscow, designated to take the leadership of the CCP by their mentors in Moscow, but they only received a cold shoulder from Li.

Doom
With so many opponents both inside and outside the CCP, Li's doom was sealed. The Comintern sent Qu Qiubai and Zhou Enlai back to China to enforce its policy. And the 28 Bolsheviks took advantage of this opportunity to denounce Li. Xiang, and Li still did not realize the clear danger he was in and criticized these young immature students severely. Then Comintern sent a telegram to call Li to Moscow for repentance. Pavel Mif, president of Moscow Sun Yat-sen University and mentor of the 28 Bolsheviks, went to Shanghai as an envoy of the Comintern also. Under Mif's direction, the 4th Plenary Meeting of 6th National Congress of the CCP was held. Li was replaced by Mif's protégé, Wang Ming, and his associates in the 28 Bolsheviks took other important jobs.

Punishment
Li went to Moscow for his confession and repentance. But he did not know it would be such a long time of redemption. In the next 15 years, Li suffered from rounds of reprimand, criticism, and purge. The Communist Party of the Soviet Union even refused to accept Li as a CCP member for several years. Moreover, when Wang Ming and Kang Sheng came back to Moscow as representatives of the CCP to the Comintern, they persecuted Li by every means available. The only comfort was that in the Soviet Union Li met and later married Lisa Kishkin, a Russian noblewoman and typesetter, who would later migrate to China with Li.

Aftermath
But Li's old friend Mao did not forget about him. Li was elected as member of the Central Committee of CCP in the 7th National Congress of the CCP held in Yan'an. In 1946, Li was sent back to China. Li first came to northeast China to work for the local division of the CCP as Minister of the City Work Department. At the outbreak of Chinese Civil War, Li was appointed as chief representative of the CCP part of the military arbitration panel consisting of members from KMT and the United States.

People's Republic of China

After the establishment of the People's Republic of China in 1949, Li went back to the field in which he was most expert, being appointed as Minister of Labor to lead the labor union. Li was dedicated to his old cause and brought forth some guidance on democratic management measures in industry, which was later called by Mao as the Constitution of Anshan Steel Mill. At the same time Li Lisan was one of the founders of the CPPCC mechanism. During the years of the Korean War, he was appointed as the secretary general of Anti Air Defence Council ranking as vice-premier, due to his anti-air attack practice during the WWII during his stay at Moscow.

Li remained an advocate of independence for the trade unions, which brought him into conflict with Mao. He was the Vice Chairman of the All-China Federation of Trade Unions until 1958 and the first president of China Institute of Industrial Relations.

Consequences of China-Soviet split
But with the Chinese-Soviet Union split in the 1960s, Li's life turned tougher and tougher again. Although his wife, Lisa Kishkin (Elizabetha Pavlovna Kishkina;), handed in her Russian passport and took Chinese nationality to show her loyalty to her husband and his country, there still was no way to ease the situation. Especially when the Cultural Revolution came, Kang Sheng spared no effort in denouncing his old rival. Li was labeled an agent of the Soviet Union and was tortured both mentally and physically by the Red Guards. His wife and daughters were also imprisoned.

Supposedly unable to face this humiliation any more, Li was said by his tormentors to have committed suicide by taking sleeping pills after finishing a final letter to Mao. Li's biographer, Patrick Lescot, has cast doubt on the nature of Li's death.
Li Sishen, Li Lisan's personal secretary, later wrote he did not believe it possible Li Lisan could have had access to sufficient pills to kill himself. Li Sishen had been responsible for overseeing the issuing of the sleeping pills. He recalled arguing with Li Lisan, who wanted an extra pill each night as the struggle sessions were affecting his sleep. Li Lisan dismissed the notion he might kill himself as ridiculous:This is a joke! I've made it through all these decades of strife and turmoil and you think I can't get through this? Are you worried I'll kill myself? Suicide would mean betraying the Party, I know that well enough; am I going to turn renegade against the Party? It's simply laughable.In 1980 the central Organisation Department finally allowed Li Lisan's family to read his autopsy report; this listed his height incorrectly by 15 cm and contained other errors which added to the family's doubts over the accepted version of Li's death. The Central Committee also held a memorial meeting for Li.

In 1983, the Hubei Provincial Committee carried out an investigation on Li's suicide, however it was fruitless and his death remains unsolved.

References 

1899 births
1967 deaths
Chinese Communist Party politicians from Hunan
Chinese politicians of Hakka descent
General Secretaries and Chairmen of the Chinese Communist Party
Delegates to the 3rd National Congress of the Chinese Communist Party
Delegates to the 4th National Congress of the Chinese Communist Party
Delegates to the 5th National Congress of the Chinese Communist Party
International Lenin School alumni
Members of the 6th Central Committee of the Chinese Communist Party
Members of the Politburo Standing Committee of the Chinese Communist Party
People from Liling
People persecuted to death during the Cultural Revolution
People's Republic of China politicians from Hunan
Politicians from Zhuzhou
Republic of China politicians from Hunan